Seyyedabad or Seydabad may refer to:

Alborz Province
 Seyyedabad, Alborz, a village in Savojbolagh County

Ardabil Province
 Seyyedabad, Ardabil, a village in Germi County

East Azerbaijan Province
Seyyedabad, East Azerbaijan, a village in Varzaqan County

Fars Province
Seyyedabad, Bavanat, a village in Bavanat County

Gilan Province
 Seyyedabad, Gilan, a village in Fuman County

Golestan Province
 Seyyedabad, Golestan, a village in Azadshahr County
 Seydabad, Golestan, a village in Torkaman County

Hamadan Province
 Seydabad, Hamadan, a village in Famenin County

Hormozgan Province
 Seyyedabad, Hormozgan, a village in Bandar Abbas County

Isfahan Province
 Seyyedabad, Isfahan, a village in Isfahan County
 Seyyedabad, Shahin Shahr and Meymeh, a village in Shahin Shahr and Meymeh County

Kerman Province
 Seyyedabad, Anbarabad, a village in Anbarabad County
 Seyyedabad-e Ilkhani, a village in Anbarabad County
 Seyyedabad, Bam, a village in Bam County
 Seyyedabad, Razmavaran, a village in Rafsanjan County
 Seyyedabad, Ravar, a village in Ravar County

Kohgiluyeh and Boyer-Ahmad Province
Seyyedabad, Kohgiluyeh and Boyer-Ahmad, a village in Charam County

Kurdistan Province
 Seyyedabad-e Jamian, a village in Saqqez County

Lorestan Province
 Seyyedabad, Lorestan, a village in Azna County

Markazi Province
 Seyyedabad, Khomeyn, a village in Khomeyn County
 Seyyedabad, Komijan, a village in Komijan County
 Seydabad, Markazi, a village in Saveh County
 Seyyedabad, Zarandieh, a village in Zarandieh County

Mazandaran Province
 Seyyedabad, Mazandaran, a village in Savadkuh County
 Seyyedabad, Sari, a village in Sari County

North Khorasan Province
 Seyyedabad, Bojnord, a village North Khorasan Province, Iran

Qazvin Province
 Seyyedabad, Qazvin, a village in Iran

Qom Province
 Seydabad, Qom, a village in Iran
 Seyyedabad, Qom, a village in Iran
 Seydabad, Jafarabad, a village in Qom Province, Iran
 Sadabad, Qom, a village in Iran

Razavi Khorasan Province
 Seyyedabad, Chenaran, a village in Chenaran County
 Seyyedabad, Golbajar, a village in Chenaran County
 Seyyedabad-e Akrad, a village in Joghatai County
 Seyyedabad, Khvaf, a village in Khvaf County
 Seyyedabad, Ahmadabad, a village in Mashhad County
 Seyyedabad, Darzab, a village in Mashhad County
 Seyyedabad, Mashhad, a village in Mashhad County
 Seyyedabad, Nishapur, a village in Nishapur County
 Seyyedabad, Sarvelayat, a village in Nishapur County
 Seyyedabad-e Asadollah Khan, a village in Nishapur County
 Seyyedabad-e Bar Madan, a village in Nishapur County
 Seyyedabad, Rashtkhvar, a village in Rashtkhvar County
 Seyyedabad-e Kalut, a village in Sabzevar County
 Seyyedabad, Torbat-e Jam, a village in Torbat-e Jam County

Semnan Province
 Seydabad, Semnan, a village in Damghan County
 Seyyedabad, Semnan, a village in Semnan County

Sistan and Baluchestan Province
 Seyyedabad, Bampur, a village in Bampur County
 Seyyedabad, Chabahar, a village in Chabahar County

South Khorasan Province
 Seyyedabad, Birjand, a village in Birjand County
 Seyyedabad, Fakhrud, a village in Darmian County
 Seyyedabad, Qohestan, a village in Darmian County
 Seyyedabad, Tabas, a village in Tabas County

Tehran Province
 Seyyedabad, Damavand, a village in Damavand County

West Azerbaijan Province
 Seyyedabad, Bukan, a village in Bukan County
 Seyyedabad-e Qajer, a village in Bukan County
 Seyyedabad, Mahabad, a village in Mahabad County

Yazd Province
 Seyyedabad, Bafq, a village in Bafq County
 Seyyedabad, Meybod, a village in Meybod County

Zanjan Province
 Seydabad, Zanjan, a village in Ijrud County

See also
Saidabad (disambiguation)
Sayed Abad, Afghanistan